is a passenger railway station located in the city of Bizen, Okayama Prefecture, Japan, operated by the West Japan Railway Company (JR West).

Lines

Station layout
The station consists of one side platform serving  single bi-directional track. There is no station building, and the station is unattended.

Adjacent stations

History
Kagato Station was opened on 1 September 1962. With the privatization of Japanese National Railways (JNR) on 1 April 1987, the station came under the control of JR West.

Passenger statistics
In fiscal 2019, the station was used by an average of 290 passengers daily

Surrounding area
Japan National Route 2
Bizen Osafune Sword Museum
Tsuruyama Maruyama Kofun

See also
List of railway stations in Japan

References

External links

 JR West Station Official Site

Railway stations in Okayama Prefecture
Akō Line
Railway stations in Japan opened in 1962
Bizen, Okayama